Year 1390 (MCCCXC) was a common year starting on Saturday (link will display full calendar) of the Julian calendar.

Events 
 January–December 
 January 19 – The Treaty of Lyck confirms an alliance between Vytautas and the Teutonic Knights, in the Lithuanian Civil War against Vytautas's cousin, Jogaila.
 April 14 – John VII Palaiologos overthrows his grandfather, John V Palaiologos, as Byzantine Emperor. 
 April 19 – Robert III succeeds his father, Robert II, as King of Scotland.
 May 26 – Lithuanian Civil War: The Treaty of Königsberg is signed in Königsberg, between Samogitian nobles and representatives of the Teutonic Knights.
 September 11 – Lithuanian Civil War: The coalition of Vytautas and the Teutonic Knights begins a 5-week siege of Vilnius. The Duke of Hereford (the future King Henry IV of England) is among the western European knights serving with the coalition.
 September 17 – John VII Palaiologos seeks refuge with the Ottoman sultan Bayezid I, after John V Palaiologos is restored by his son, Manuel, and the Republic of Venice.
 October 9 – Henry III succeeds his father, John I, as King of Castile and León.

 Date unknown 
 The Ottomans take Philadelphia, the last Byzantine enclave of any significance in Anatolia.
 Barquq is restored as Mamluk Sultan of Egypt, after overthrowing Sultan Hadji II.
 Nasir ud din Muhammad Shah III overthrows his brother, Abu Bakr Shah, as Sultan of Delhi.
 Manuel III succeeds his father, Alexios III, as Emperor of Trebizond (now north eastern Turkey).
 Sikandar But-shikan succeeds Sikandar Shah, as Sultan of Kashmir.
 Ko Cheng succeeds Che Bong Nga, as King of Champa (now eastern Vietnam).
 Mahmud succeeds Sandaki as Mansa of the Mali Empire, restoring the Keita dynasty.
 N'Diklam Sare succeeds Sare N'Dyaye, as ruler of the Jolof Empire (now part of Senegal).
 The Kingdom of Kaffa is established in present day Ethiopia (approximate date).
 Templo Mayor, the main temple of the Aztec capital of Tenochtitlan (now Mexico City), is built. 
 The Candi Surawana Temple is built in the Majapahit Kingdom (now Indonesia).
 Construction begins on San Petronio Basilica in Bologna.

Births 
 October 3 – Humphrey, Duke of Gloucester (d. 1447)
 December 27 – Anne de Mortimer, claimant to the English throne (d. 1411)
date unknown
 Moctezuma I, Aztec ruler of Tenochtitlan, son of Huitzilihuitl (d. 1469)
 probable
 John Dunstaple, English composer (d. 1453)
 Engelbrekt Engelbrektsson, Swedish statesman and rebel leader (d. 1436)
 Contessina de' Bardi, politically active Florentine woman (d. 1473)
 Jan van Eyck, Flemish painter (d. 1441)

Deaths 
 January 26 – Adolph IX, Count of Holstein-Kiel (b.c 1327)
 February 16 – Rupert I, Elector Palatine (b. 1309)
 March 20 – Alexios III Megas Komnenos, Emperor of Trebizond (b. 1338)
 April 19 – King Robert II of Scotland (b. 1316)
 July 8 – Albert of Saxony, Bishop of Halberstadt and German philosopher (b. circa 1320)
 August 14 – John FitzAlan, 2nd Baron Arundel, English soldier (b. 1364)
 September 23 – John I, Duke of Lorraine (b. 1346)
 October 9 – King John I of Castile (fall from a horse) (b. 1358)
 September – Towtiwil, Prince of Black Ruthenia
 date unknown
 Sandaki Mari Djata, Mansa of the Mali Empire
 Keratsa of Bulgaria, Byzantine empress consort (b. 1348)
 Sa'ad al-Din Masud ibn Umar ibn Abd Allah al-Taftazani, Ilkhanate polymath (b. 1322)
 probable – Altichiero, Italian painter (b. 1330)

References